Fernwood Publishing is an independent Canadian publisher that publishes non-fiction books dealing with social justice and issues of social, political and economic importance.

Fernwood was founded in 1991 in Halifax, Nova Scotia, publishing its first books in the spring of 1992. The Halifax office was moved to Black Point, Nova Scotia and, in 1994, a second office was opened in Winnipeg, Manitoba. In eighteen seasons, Fernwood has published over 300 titles. In 2006, Fernwood acquired Roseway Publishing, which is now their fiction imprint.

Fernwood offers an alternative Canadian perspective on issues that many major book publishers do not. Founder and co-publisher Errol Sharpe has been quoted as saying, "In an era when the restructuring of capitalism seems to be threatening to erase many of the gains that have been made by the oppressed in society, we think that our books have a part to play in bucking the trend."

In 2018, Fernwood Publishing released There’s Something in the Water by Ingrid Waldron. In 2020, It inspired a documentary that premiered in Toronto International Film Festival (TIFF) and eventually in Netflix.

Notable releases
 Thom Workman, If you're in my way I'm walking: The assault on working people since 1970 
 Anthony Fenton and Yves Engler, Canada in Haiti: Waging War on the Poor Majority 
 Socialist Studies (series)
 Annette Aurelie Desmarais, La Via Campesina: Globalization and the Power of Peasants 
 Anne Bishop, Becoming an Ally: Breaking the Cycle of Oppression in People
 Sean Comish, The Westray Tragedy: A Miner's Story
Sophie Dubuisson-Quellier, Ethical Consumption. Protest Series. 
 Elizabeth Comack, Women in Trouble: Connecting Women’s Law Violation to their Histories of Abuse
 Patricia Monture-Angus, Thunder in My Soul: A Mohawk Woman Speaks
 Jim Silver, Thin Ice: Money, Politics and the Demise of an NHL Franchise
 Barrie Anderson and Dawn Anderson, Manufacturing Guilt: Wrongful Convictions in Canada
 An Autobiography by Burnley "Rocky" Jones and James St. G. Walker: Burnley "Rocky" Jones Revolutionary

References

External links
Fernwood Publishing

Book publishing companies of Canada
Companies based in Halifax, Nova Scotia
Companies based in Winnipeg
Political book publishing companies